Trần Khánh Giư, pen-name Khái Hưng (1896 in Cổ Am village, Vĩnh Bảo, Hải Phòng – 17 November 1947 in Cựa Gà, Xuân Trường) was a Vietnamese novelist, a pro-independence but non-communist intellectual.

As a boy he studied at the Lycée Albert Sarraut in Hanoi. From 1933 he was part of the new Tự Lực Văn Đoàn "Self-Strengthening Literary Group" with editor Nhất Linh and his novels were first serialized in the group's magazines before being published as books. Just as Nhất Linh was a pen name ("One-Zero" 壹零) Giu briefly adopted the pen name Nhị Linh ("Two-Zero" 貳零).

In 1941, as a member of Nhat Linh's Dai Viet Democratic Party (DVDC) he was arrested by the French, along with the artist Nguyễn Gia Trí.

He was captured by the Việt Minh in the Lạc Quần, Trực Ninh area, then executed at Cựa Gà on 17 November 1947.

Works
His novels were written in a style influenced by social realism, and were critical of many aspects of traditional Vietnamese society.

Novels
Hồn bướm mơ tiên (1933)
Ðời mưa gió (with Nhất Linh, 1933)
Nửa Chừng Xuân (1934)
Gánh hàng hoa (with Nhất Linh, 1934)
Trống mái (1936)
Gia đình (1936)
Tiêu sơn tráng sĩ (1937)
Thoát ly (1938)
Hạnh (1938)
Ðẹp (1940)
Thanh Ðức (1942)

Collections of Stories
Anh phải sống (with Nhất Linh, 1934)
Tiếng suối reo (1935)
Ðợi chờ (1940)
Cái ve (1944)

References

Vietnamese writers
1896 births
1947 deaths
People from Haiphong
20th-century novelists
20th-century male writers
20th-century Vietnamese writers
19th-century Vietnamese writers